WCRE (1420 AM) is a radio station broadcasting a classic hits format. Licensed to Cheraw, South Carolina, United States, the station is owned by Pee Dee Broadcasting, LLC.

References

External links

CRE